Gela Mou (Greek: Γέλα Μου; English: Smile for me) is the first studio album by Greek singer Despina Vandi. It was released in Greece in 1994 by Minos EMI. It includes her very first mass hits "Gela mou", "Den Iparhi Tipota" and "To Adiexodo", a duet with Greek singer Giannis Parios. Αccording to Despina Vandi it sold 14,000 copies.

Track listing

Music videos
"Gela Mou"
"Den Iparhi Tipota"
"To Adiexodo" (feat. Giannis Parios)

Release history

Credits and personnel

Personnel
P. Apostolidis - music, bouzouki, tzoura, baglama
Giannis Doras - background vocals
M. Doulianakis - lyrics
P. Dragoumis - electric bass
P. Falara - lyrics
B. Giagkoudis - guitar electric-acoustic
M. Giaprakas - music
Giannis Gkiouras - piano, keys, accordion, orchestration
Vasilis Karras - music, lyrics, background vocals
Z. Kasiaras - violin
L. Komninos - lyrics
Tony Kontaxakis - music, lyrics, orchestration
Giannis Parios - vocals, background vocals
Panagiotis Tsaousakis - percussion, background vocals
Despina Vandi - vocals

Production
Thodoris Hrisanthopoulos - transfer
D. Margetakis - programming
L. Neromiliotis - sound, remixing
Achilleas Theofilou - production manager
Konstantinos Theofilou - sound

Design
Ntinos Diamantopoulos - photos
Achilleas Haritos - styling
Michalis Orfanos - print
Vaso Papada - imagesetter
Alkistis Spilioti - cover care

Credits adapted from the album's liner notes.

References

Despina Vandi albums
Greek-language albums
1994 albums
Minos EMI albums